Majhe Pati Saubhagyawati is a Marathi language television program that aired on Zee Marathi.

Plot 
It is a story of Vaibhav Malwankar. Vaibhav and his wife Laxmi come to Mumbai around 14 years ago. He has a dream to become a successful actor, but after too many rejections he has reached a stage where it becomes a crumble. He has one last chance to give a good life for his wife and himself. The role which is going to perform is lady character who gives his career and also help him to change his life completely.

Cast

Main 
 Vaibhav Mangle as Vaibhav Malwankar
 Nandita Dhuri as Laxmi Vaibhav Malwankar

Recurring 
 Ashok Shinde as P. K.
 Ramesh Bhatkar as Makarand Bhandari
 Aarti Vadagbalkar as Surekha; Vaibhav's hairstylist
 Uday Sabnis as Laxmi's father
 Adwait Dadarkar as Director of Vaibhav's serial
 Samir Paranjape as Sandy; Laxmi's brother
 Sandeep Pathak as Surekha's husband
 Sneha Majgaonkar as Manisha
 Ruchira Jadhav
 Uma Sardeshmukh
 Surbhi Bhave-Damle

Reception 
The series premiered on 28 September 2015 from Monday to Saturday at 8.30 pm by replacing Julun Yeti Reshimgathi.

Ratings

Special episode (1 hour) 
 25 October 2015
 29 November 2015
 14 February 2016

References

External links 
 Majhe Pati Saubhagyawati at ZEE5
 

Marathi-language television shows
Zee Marathi original programming
2015 Indian television series debuts
2016 Indian television series endings